Ivar Loe Bjørnstad (born 1981 in Surnadal, Norway) is a Norwegian jazz and rock musician (drums), brother of the dancer Marit Loe Bjørnstad (1983) and the singer Ingebjørg Loe Bjørnstad (1978).

Career 
Bjørnstad studied jazz at the Norwegian Academy of Music in Oslo together with Hedvig Mollestad Thomassen and Even Helte Hermansen (guitarist of Bushman's Revenge). With an origin as a rock musician, he also mentions the guitarist Bill Frisell as one of his inspirations, accompanied by the major Norwegian drummers Audun Kleive and Per Oddvar Johansen. He resides in Oslo, and has since the turn of the Millennium collaborated with countless bands and constellations in a variety of genres. He has collaborated with artists like Bjørn Kjellemyr, Jon Eberson, Karl Seglem, Ken Stringfellowcurrently, and currently (2013) play within the bands Hedvig Mollestad Trio, the Hilde Marie Kjersem Band and Cakewalk. The debut album Shoot! of the Hedvig Mollestad Trio was recorded live in the studio with only a few minor overdubs.

Discography 

Within Hedvig Mollestad Trio
2011: Shoot! (Rune Grammofon)
2013: All Of Them Witches (Rune Grammofon)
2014: Enfant Terrible! (Rune Grammofon)
2016: Black Stabat Mater (Rune Grammofon)
2016: Evil In Oslo (Rune Grammofon)

Within Cakewalk
2012: Wired (Rune Grammofon)

References

External links 

Origo.no om akademiet

1981 births
Living people
People from Surnadal
20th-century Norwegian drummers
21st-century Norwegian drummers
Norwegian jazz drummers
Male drummers
Musicians from Møre og Romsdal
20th-century drummers
20th-century Norwegian male musicians
21st-century Norwegian male musicians
Male jazz musicians